The Philippine House Committee on Poverty Alleviation, or House Poverty Alleviation Committee is a standing committee of the Philippine House of Representatives.

Jurisdiction 
As prescribed by House Rules, the committee's jurisdiction is on the policies and programs that will tackle the poverty situation and similar measures on poverty alleviation including the promotion of the poor's right to equal access to opportunities for a better quality of life.

Members, 18th Congress

Historical members

18th Congress

Member for the Majority 
 Nestor Fongwan (Benguet–Lone, PDP–Laban)

See also 
 House of Representatives of the Philippines
 List of Philippine House of Representatives committees
 National Anti-Poverty Commission

Notes

References

External links 
House of Representatives of the Philippines

Poverty
Poverty in the Philippines